Wyndham C. Emery (birth registered first ¼ 1897 – 1969) was a Welsh professional rugby league footballer who played in the 1920s.

Background
Wyndham Emery's birth was registered in Bridgend, Wales, and he died  aged 72 in Bridgend, Wales.

International honours
Wyndham Emery won a cap for Wales while at Leigh in 1922, and won a cap for Other Nationalities while at Leigh.

Marriage
Wyndham Emery's marriage to Ellen (née Hilton) was registered during third ¼ 1922 in Leigh district. They had children; Dorothy Emery (birth registered during second ¼ 1924 in Leigh district), and Reginald T. Emery (birth registered during second ¼ 1928 in Leigh district).

References

England & Wales, Birth/Death Indexes

1897 births
1969 deaths
Leigh Leopards players
Other Nationalities rugby league team players
Rugby league players from Bridgend
Rugby league centres
Wales national rugby league team players
Welsh rugby league players